The 2002 season was the Hawthorn Football Club's 78th season in the Australian Football League and 101st overall.

Fixture

Premiership season

Ladder

References

Hawthorn Football Club seasons